Andreas Papagiannakopoulos (1845-1911) was a judge and a politician of Kalavryta and Achaea.

He was born in Leivartzi and moved to Patras at a young age. He studied law and was engaged in journalism, publishing the newspapers Pelopas and Toxotis in 1876. He became a municipal police officer in 1883 but was dismissed a year later.

He was elected as a Member of the Hellenic Parliament for Kalavryta in 1885 and continuously from 1887 until 1910 for the Achaea Prefecture.  He tried to be elected as mayor of Patras but without success.

He died on January 12, 1911, in Athens at the Evangelismos Hospital.  His funeral oration was read by Loukas Roufos.

See also
Politics of Greece

References
Patrinologimata, volume II, Nikos Politis, Peri Technon, Patras 2004, 

1845 births
1911 deaths
Greek MPs 1885–1887
Greek MPs 1887–1890
Greek MPs 1890–1892
Greek MPs 1895–1899
Greek MPs 1899–1902
Greek MPs 1905–1906
Greek MPs 1906–1910
Greek MPs 1892–1895
Greek MPs 1902–1905
Greek journalists
Greek newspaper editors
People from Aroania
Politicians from Patras